Battista is a given name and surname which means Baptist in Italian.

Given named
 Battista Agnese (died 1564), cartographer from the Republic of Genoa, who worked in the Venetian Republic
 Battista Dossi, also known as Battista de Luteri, Italian painter
 Battista Farina (1893-1966), later Battista Pininfarina, Italian automobile designer and the founder of the Carrozzeria Pininfarina.
 Battista Sforza (1446-1472), Duchess of Urbino and second wife of Federico da Montefeltro

Surnamed
 Bobbie Battista (1952-2020), American journalist 
 Giovanni Battista, multiple people
 Miriam Battista (1912-1980), American actress
 Orlando Aloysius Battista (1917-1995), Canadian chemist and author.

Others
 Battista, a Disney character who is Scrooge McDuck's butler.
Pininfarina Battista, the first car from Automobili Pininfarina

See also 
 Baptist (disambiguation)
 Batista (Portuguese/Spanish surname)
 Bautista (Spanish surname) meaning "Baptist"
 Baptista (Portuguese surname) meaning "Baptist"
 Baptiste (name) (French surname and given name) meaning "Baptist"

Italian given names
Italian-language surnames